The third season of Drop Dead Diva premiered on June 19, 2011 and concluded on September 25, 2011, on Lifetime. Season three aired on Sundays at 9:00 pm ET and consisted of 13 episodes. Sally Fields had a guest appearance as the judge for the episode.

Storylines

Jane/Deb & Grayson
Grayson nearly marries Vanessa, but she backs out on the day of the wedding. Jane has two relationships during the season that indicate she is trying to move on from Grayson.  The first, with Dr. Bill Kendall (Ben Shenkman), ends when he reveals that Jane is one of the several women he is dating and that he is not ready to get serious with any one of them.  The second, toward the end of the season, is with a fun-loving new judge named Owen French (Lex Medlin).

Kim & Parker
Kim and Parker's relationship was short lived, after Kim realized that Parker just ignored all of his ex-partners. In the end of Season 2, Jane shares with Kim that she saw Harrison and Parker kissing in Parker's office. Kim is outraged and goes to Parker's house to tell him that they're over. Harrison fires Kim from the firm in the end of Season 2, but she returns in Mid-Season 3. In early Season 3, Parker still tries to charm Kim and begs her to come back to him. She refuses, and keeps moving on with her job and maintaining a platonic relationship with her boss.  They end up together in a later episode, seemingly giving their relationship another try. But when Parker hired his former flame Elisa (Brandy) as a temp, Kim became jealous, putting Jane in a tough situation, knowing that Elisa has a son with Parker and Parker doesn't know anything about it.

Fred & Stacy
Stacy shares with Jane that she's afraid Fred thinks that the kissing IS the relationship, and they have not progressed to intercourse. Stacy keeps waking up early to run, claiming she runs a lot when she's frustrated. Jane then gives Fred advice, because Jane knows everything Stacy wants in a man. Afterward, it appears the relationship has been consummated and is going well, because Stacy claims she "may never run again."

Stacy finally gets a part on a TV show as a main star. She claims that she has to keep her relationship with Fred a "secret" for publicity purposes, but eventually she ends up cheating on Fred with her co-star, Brian (Robert Hoffman), and Fred witnesses the two sharing a passionate kiss. Stacy is unable to choose between Brian and Fred; despite Jane's advice for her to talk to Fred, the choice is made for Stacy when Fred eventually confronts her and angrily leaves. Stacy becomes distraught and upset with Jane, believing Jane told Fred of her infidelity. Fred is later shown having drinks with Grayson and Teri, who comfort him. 

Stacy's behavior ends up annoying not only Fred, but also Jane/Deb and Teri when she becomes a diva and starts treating her friends like dirt, leading to a failed intervention. Brian steals her commercial deal and sleeps with her assistant, resulting in Stacy punching out Brian and getting arrested for assault. She is later cleared of the charges, but kisses Grayson after he represented her. Although the two quickly realize it was a mistake, Stacy is unaware that Jane saw it. Jane also tells Fred at the airport about what happened, thus devastating Fred who was ready to forgive Stacy and propose to her.

Cast

Main cast
 Brooke Elliott as Jane Bingum (13 episodes)
 Margaret Cho as Teri Lee (13 episodes)
 April Bowlby as Stacy Barrett (13 episodes)
 Kate Levering as Kim Kaswell (13 episodes)
 Jackson Hurst as Grayson Kent (13 episodes)
 Josh Stamberg as Jay Parker (13 episodes)
 Ben Feldman as Fred (13 episodes)

Recurring cast
 Ben Shenkman as Dr. Bill Kendall (5 episodes)
 Lex Medlin as Judge Owen French (4 episodes)
 Marcus Lyle Brown as ADA Paul Saginaw (3 episodes)
 Robert Hoffman as Brian Pullman (3 episodes)
 Brandy as Elisa Shayne (3 episodes)
 Jaime Ray Newman as Vanessa Hemmings (3 episodes)
 Vickie Eng as Judge Rita Mayson (3 episodes)

Guest cast
 Gregory Alan Williams as Judge Warren Libby (2 episodes)
 Jeff Rose as Doug Resnick (2 episodes)
 Sharon Lawrence as Bobbie Dobkins (2 episodes)
 Faith Prince as Elaine Bingum (1 episode)
 Rhoda Griffis as Paula Dewey (1 episode)
 Paula Abdul as Judge Paula Abdul (1 episode)
 Brooke D'Orsay as Deb Dobkins (1 episode)

Episodes

References

External links
 Drop Dead Diva on Lifetime
 

2011 American television seasons